Berlin, Berlin is a television series produced for the ARD. It aired in Germany from 2002 to 2005 Tuesdays through Fridays at 18:50 on the German public TV network Das Erste. The show won both national and international awards.

A sequel film, Berlin, Berlin, was released on Netflix on May 8, 2020.

Plot 
The series tells the story of Lolle (played by Felicitas Woll) who, after finishing school, follows her boyfriend, Tom, from Malente to Berlin. Once there, she discovers that Tom has been cheating on her with another girl. Rather than move back home, Lolle decides to stay in Berlin with her cousin, Sven (played by Jan Sosniok), his best friends Hart (Matthias Klimsa) and Rosalie (Sandra Borgmann). 
At the end of season one Lolle and Sven fall in love with each other, even though they are second cousins. Their grandparents were siblings, as is revealed in the first episode when Daniel, Sven's son, asks Lolle how she is related to him.

Before getting into a relationship with Lolle, Sven instead decides to go back to his former wife, Silvia, because of Daniel. Season one also follows Lolle's relationship with the ex-girlfriend, Rosalie, of Tom's new girlfriend. At the end of season one, Rosalie, an actress, leaves Germany to go to the USA and pursue a new life.

At the beginning of season two Lolle, desperate after losing Sven to Silvia and Rosalie's departure to the USA, she finds a new friend with Rosalie's former girlfriend, Sara (Rhea Harder). At first Lolle wants to convince Sven to love her, but he seems to be undecided and is unsure of what he should do. She then meets Alex, an art student, and they become a couple. Sven separates from Silvia once more, however, and is now free to be with Lolle, but she replies that she should stay with Alex. At the end of season two, she realizes that she loves Sven too, and attempts being with both Sven and Alex. Hart also begins to acknowledge his love for Sarah, and after a series of problems, they get together.

Cast

Episodes
Series One (2002)
 Landflucht (Pilot)
 Wie bekomme ich meinen Freund zurück
 Happy Birthday, Lolle
 Auf der Flucht
 Rotalarm
 Ich will Sandra Bullock massieren
 Selbstversuch
 All you need is love
 Träume
 Lolle und der Traumprinz
 Nicht ganz koscher
 Die Geliebte
 Singles
 Dr. Strangelove
 Lesbe sein dagegen sehr
 Küssen, küssen, küssen
 Lolle gegen Fatman
 Ich bin nicht nett
 Beste Freunde
 Taddi und Mr. Psycho
 Cousin und Cousine
 Extremsitutionen ...
 Martha
 Überraschungen
 Eine Million
 Positiv ist negativ

Series Two (2003)

 Lolle allein in Berlin
 Frisch verheiratet
 Cinderello
 Froschkönige
 Höllendate
 Männer sind auch nur Menschen
 Malente, Malente
 Eltern, früher oder später kriegen sie dich
 Looking for Beinlich
 Nicht fair
 Wer liebt Fatman?
 Big and Beautiful
 Kairo
 That's the way
 Ex und hopp
 Spieglein, Spieglein
 Gegen die Uhr
 20 Minuten
 Ich lieb dich nicht - du liebst mich nicht
 Aha

Series Three (2004)

 Sven oder Alex?
 Alex oder Sven
 Nimm Zwei
 Nicht genug
 Jung, dynamisch, arbeitslos
 Backe, backe Kuchen
 Mütter und Töchter
 Ziemlich ähnlich
 Generationen
 Hochzeitsspiele
 Svenja
 Täuschen, tarnen, küssen
 Vero
 That's what friends are for 
 The weapons of women 
 The ghosts I called 
 Again with feeling 
 Daily Talk 
 Dream job 
 Wickie

 Series Four (2005) 

 Stuttgart - Stuttgart 
 Real friends 
 At first Blick 
 fear is stupid 
 happy family 
 had pig 
 love is… 
 revenge is… 
 what if 
 fate 
 Silvia 
 Rituals 
 Hero of the Year 
 Be Hard 
 The wedding dress 
 Deus ex machina 
 Hormones are stupid 
 Weekend in the country 
 The wedding 
 Melbourne, Melbourne (Finale)

Awards 
In 2004 the series won an International Emmy Award in the category "Best Comedy" for Episode 47.

References

External links 
 

  

2002 German television series debuts
2005 German television series endings
Das Erste original programming
German comedy-drama television series
German-language television shows
Grimme-Preis for fiction winners
International Emmy Award for best comedy series winners
Television series with live action and animation
Television shows about comics
Television shows set in Berlin